Tarsem Singh Dhandwar (born 26 May 1961), known professionally as Tarsem, is an Indian director who has worked on films, music videos, and commercials. He directed The Cell (2000), The Fall (2006, also screenwriter and producer), Immortals (2011),  Mirror Mirror (2012), and Self/less (2015).

Early life 
Tarsem was born in Jalandhar, Punjab to a Punjabi Sikh family. His father was an aircraft engineer. He attended Bishop Cotton School in Shimla, Hans Raj College in Delhi, and is a graduate of the Art Center College of Design in Pasadena, California.

Career 
Tarsem began his career directing music videos, including those of "Hold On" by En Vogue, "Sweet Lullaby" by Deep Forest and R.E.M.'s "Losing My Religion", the latter of which won Best Music Video, Short Form at the 1992 Grammy Awards. He has directed commercials for brands such as Nike and Coca-Cola. Tarsem's feature film directorial debut was The Cell (2000), starring Jennifer Lopez.

In 2003, Tarsem directed one of the most elaborate Pepsi commercials to date. It combined a gladiator theme with Queen's "We Will Rock You". The commercial starred Enrique Iglesias in the version of the commercial aired in Europe and North America and Amr Diab in the version aired in the Arab world.

Tarsem's second film, The Fall, debuted at the 2006 Toronto International Film Festival and was released theatrically in the United States in 2008. His third film was 2011's Immortals. He directed an adaptation of the Brothers Grimm story of "Snow White", called Mirror Mirror (2012).

In 2020, Tarsem made his return to music videos with Lady Gaga's single "911", his first in 26 years.

In 2021, his Super Bowl ad for Toyota featuring the adoption of US Paralympian Jessica Long won significant critical acclaim.

Filmography as director (feature films, television, music videos and commercials)

Feature films
 The Cell (2000) 
 The Fall (2006)
 Immortals (2011)
 Mirror Mirror (2012)
 Self/less (2015)
 Dear Jassi (post-production, expected in 2023)

Television
 Emerald City (2017)

Music videos
 En Vogue – "Hold On" (1990)
 Suzanne Vega – "Tired of Sleeping" (1990)
 R.E.M. – "Losing My Religion" (1991)
 The Dream Academy – "Love" (1991)
 Dream Warriors – "My Definition of a Boombastic Jazz Style" (1991)
 Lou Reed – "What's Good" (1992)
 Vanessa Paradis – "Be My Baby" (1992)
 Deep Forest – "Sweet Lullaby" (1994)
 Lady Gaga – "911" (2020)

Commercials
One of the most highly widely acclaimed and  highly prolific active commercial directors for the past decades. Here is a comprehensive list of most of his work which is as relevant artistic and creative work as his feature films and music videos.
 Levi's – "Swimmer" (1992)
 Smirnoff – "Message in a Bottle" (1992)
 McEwans Export – "Countdown" (1992)
 Vauxhall Corsa – "Side Impact Bar" (1993)
 Opel Corsa – "Supermodels" (1993)
 Opel Corsa – "Naomi" (1993)
 Audi – "Men have a Soul" (1993)
 Vauxhall Corsa – "Supermodels" (1993)
 Kellogs Corn Pops – "Catch" (1993)
 Milk Tray – "Chess" (1994)
 Volkswagen – "Blob" (1994)
 Mulino Bianco – "Roma" (1994)
 Mulino Bianco – "Firenze" (1994)
 Mulino Bianco – "Venezia" (1994)
 Audi – "Dress" (1994)
 Coca-Cola – "Batsman" (1995)
 Coca-Cola – "Bowler - Pakistan" (1995)
 Coca-Cola – "Bowler" (1995)
 Coca-Cola – "Fielder - Pakistan" (1995)
 Coca-Cola – "Fielder" (1995)
 Nike – "Good versus Evil" (1995)
 Audi A6 Avant – "Goodbye" (1995)
 Isuzu – "Paris Dakar" (1995)
 Levi's – "Washroom" (1996)
 Infiniti – "Masquerade" (1996)
 Infiniti – "Wedding" (1996)
 Infiniti – "Restaurant" (1996)
 Infiniti – "Jazz Club" (1996)
 Infiniti – "Bridge" (1996)
 Infiniti – "Park" (1996)
 Infiniti – "Movie Theatre" (1996)
 Sprint PCS – "Romans" (1996)
 Sprint PCS – "Egyptians" (1996)
 Sprint PCS – "Incas" (1996)
 Superga – "The Challenge" (1996)
 MTV – "Food for Thought" (1996)
 Coca-Cola – "Cricket" (1996)
 D2 Privat – "Telephone" (1997)
 Mastercard – "Anniversary in India" (1997)
 Mercedes-Benz – "Trick" (1997)
 Audi A6 – "Visions" (1997)
 Schweppes – "Diamond Mine" (1997)
 Reebok – "Storm" (1997)
 Nike – "Foreign Legion" (1997)
 John Hancock – "Saravejo" (1997)
 Levi's – "They Go On" (6-part ad series) (1997)
 Miller Lite – "Pro Wrestlers" (1997)
 Volvo V70 – "The Ice Hotel" (1998) 
 Beck's – "Romance" (1998)
 Beck's – "Laid Back" (1998)
 Beck's – "Comedy" (1998)
 Philips – "Rain" (1998) 
 Philips – "Idiot" (1998) 
 Philips – "The Pool Boy" (1998) 
 Philips – "Kiss" (1998) 
 Mercedes – "Orchestra Leader" (1998) 
 GMC Envoy – "Tunnel" (1998) 
 GMC Envoy – "Steel Mill" (1998) 
 Volkswagen – "Pursuit of Excellence" (1998)
 Campari – "Scratch" (1998) 
 Nike – "Beach Boys" (1998) 
 Conseco – "Boxer" (1998) 
 Conseco – "Italian Woman" (1998) 
 Honda – "Honda Accord V6 - Happy Cat" (1998) 
 Volvo – "Lift off" (1999)
 France Telecom – "Little Boy" (1999)
 Absolut Vodka – "Beat Crazy" (1999)
 Coca-Cola – "Outsiders" (1999)
 Coca-Cola – "Running to the Store" (1999)
 Audi AG A8 – "Fate" (1999)
 Pepsi – "Foosball" (2000)
 Pepsi – "Shirt" (2000)
 Levi's – "Dockers - E-Train" (2000)
 Got Milk – "Superheroes" (2000)
 Miller – "On the Run" (2000)
 Miller – "Haircut" (2000)
 Miller – "Love Thy Neighbour" (2000)
 GO.COM – "Crawl Space" (2000)
 GO.COM – "Be Do Be Do" (2000)
 GO.COM – "Barn" (2000)
 GO.COM – "Ceiling Tile" (2000)
 Nike – "Gladiator" (2000)
 Nike – "The Mission" (2000)
 HSBC – "Running" (2000)
 HSBC – "Train" (2000)
 Pepsi – "Beckham" (2001)
 Mountain Dew – "Duo" (2001)
 Beck's – "Engineer's Night Out" (2001)
 Bacardi – "Kiss" (2001)
 Bacardi – "Laugh" (2001)
 Bacardi – "Lipstick" (2001)
 Bacardi – "Groove" (2001)
 Bacardi – "Move" (2001)
 Bacardi – "Closing Time" (2001)
 Orange – "Leo" (2001)
 Orange – "Football" (2001)
 Telewest – "Cemetery" (2001)
 Ericsson – "Flowers" (2001)
 Ericsson – "Reception" (2001)
 Martini – "Mission" (2001)
 Becks – "Technicians Night Out" (2001)
 Becks – "Frisbee" (2001)
 Becks – "Barmaid" (2001)
 Becks – "Accordion" (2001)
 BMW Compact – "Home" (2001)
 Pepsi – "Kung Fu" (2002)
 Pepsi – "Sumo" (2002)
 Pepsi – "Sumo Rematch" (2002)
 Campari – "The Duel" (2002)
 Wanadoo – "Positive Generation" (2002)
 T-Mobile – "Anthem" (2002)
 T-Mobile – "Czech" (2002)
 T-Mobile – "Italian" (2002)
 T-Mobile – "Bored" (2002)
 Nationwide – "Every Minute – Football" (2002)
 Gatorade – "UV Labrats" (2002)
 Guinness – "Tom Crean" (2002)
 Orange – "Pictures" (2002)
 Orange – "Private Utopia" (2002)
 7 UP – "Masseuses" (2002)
 Landrover Freelander – "Gourd" (2002)
 Nationwide – "England Team" (2002)
 Nationwide – "Every Minute" (2002)
 McDonald's – "Being Six" (2002)
 Intel – "Moving Day" (2003)
 Intel – "Airport" (2003)
 Intel – "Diver" (2003)
 Pepsi – "Elephant Tower" (2003)
 Pepsi – "OK Corral" (2003)
 Pepsi – "Longer Nights" (2003)
 Renault – "Performance" (2003)
 Citroën – "Les Magiciens" (2003)
 Pepsi – "Gladiators" (2003)
 Vodafone – "Beckham Blue Skies" (2003)
 Pepsi – "Footbattle" (2003)
 Vodafone – "Ferrari Fan" (2003)
 Halifax – "Just a Little" (2003)
 Vodafone – "Lounge" (2003)
 Nissan Maxima – "Orange" (2003)
 Nissan Maxima – "Jogger" (2003)
 Nissan Maxima – "Cab" (2003)
 Intel – "Moving Day" (2003)
 Toyota Prius – "Move Forward / Standstill" (2003)
 Citroën – "Les Mains / The Painting" (2004)
 Pepsi – "Surf" (2004)
 Pepsi – "Wanted" (2004)
 Pepsi – "Samurai" (2004)
 Nike – "The Warriors" (2004)
 Verizon – "Togetherness" (2005)
 Verizon – "Glory" (2005)
 Verizon – "In" (2005)
 Verizon – "Adrenaline" (2005)
 Orange – "Louise" (2005)
 Campari – "The Wedding" (2005)
 Pepsi – "Party" (2005)
 Puma – "Body X" (2006)
 Cisco Systems – "Anthem" (2006)
 Acura – "Rush" (2006)
 Pepsi – "Shuffle" (2006)
 Pepsi – "Pepsi Fest - Germany" (2006)
 Disney – "Anthem" (2006)
 Softbank – "India" (2006)
 Softbank – "Palace" (2006)
 T-Com – "Limitless" (2007)
 TUI – "Tagebuch" (2007)
 The Hartford – "200 Years in a Moment" (2007)
 Mercedes – "The Race" (2007)
 Magnum – "Prayers" (2007)
 EDF – "Doors" (2007)
 Nike – "Beautiful Focus" (2008)
 Nike – "Who Are You?" (2008)
 Volvo – "Discuss" (2008)
 Nestea – "Stamp" (2008)
 Nestea – "Temple" (2008)
 Cisco Systems – "Town Square" (2008)
 Cisco Systems – "The Shortest Commute" (2008)
 Gatorade – "Part I: Enchanter" (2009)
 Gatorade – "Part II: Hecklers" (2009)
 Gatorade – "Part III: Beware the Jabbawockeez" (2009)
 Gatorade – "Part IV: EGO" (2009)
 Gatorade – "Part V: Game 7" (2009)
 Yellowtale – "Tragedy" (2009)
 Palm Pre – "Anima" (2009)
 Fiat – "Fiat 500 - Docuspot" (2009)
 Islam Project – "Islam is Colours" (2009)
 Islam Project – "Islam is Refined" (2009)
 Islam Project – "Islam is Tolerant" (2009)
 Lays – "Lays Sensations - Lamb and Chili" (2009)
 Lays – "Lays Sensations - Mozarella and Pesto" (2009)
 Bajaj Electricals – "BOTS" (2009)
 Kia – "Kia Forte - Pioneers" (2009)
 Kia – "Kia Soul - Hamsters" (2009)
 Dodge – "Snow" (2010)
 The Cosmopolitan – "Just the Right Amount of Wrong" (2010)
 Lancôme – "La Vie est Belle" (2012)
 McDonald's – "Court" (2013)
 Pepsi – "L.O.V.E." (2013)
 Pepsi – "Toast" (2013)
 Pepsi – "Come On" (2013)
 Sony – "Sony Xperia Z - The Gift of Sound and Vision" (2013)
 Morgan Stanley – "Anthem" (2013)
 Morgan Stanley – "Better Tomorrow" (2013)
 Morgan Stanley – "Pursuit of a Better Life" (2013)
 Mountain Dew – "Satellite" (2013)
 Miller Lite – "Cornermen" (2013)
 Carte Noir – "Fire & Ice" (2014)
 Samsung – "Samsung Galaxy S5 - Curiosity" (2014)
 Samsung – "Samsung Galaxy S5 - Time" (2014)
 Samsung – "Samsung Galaxy S5 - Moment" (2014)
 POM Wonderful – "Archers" (2014)
 POM Wonderful – "Cyclops" (2014)
 POM Wonderful – "Samurai" (2014)
 POM Wonderful – "Dragon" (2014)
 BMW – "Curiosity" (2014)
 BMW – "Unbridled Joy" (2015)
 Dubai Tourism – "Footprints" (2015)
 Cadillac – "ATS Coupe - Irresistible" (2015)
 Mountain Dew – "Tree Top" (2017)
 Samsung – "Infinitely Amazing" (2017)
 Taco Bell – "Masterpieces - Potato Burrito" (2017)
 Taco Bell – "Masterpieces - Queso Beef Nachos" (2017)
 Swisscom – "Best Net" (2018)
 Experian – "Old Way" (2018)
 Experian – "Days in the Life" (2018)
 Experian – "Drive Thru" (2018)
 Experian – "Scoreboard" (2018)
 Pepsi – "Aboudia" (2019)
 Pepsi – "Nayeli" (2019)
 Pepsi – "Hisham" (2019)
 Pepsi – "The Toys" (2019)
 Pepsi – "No Regrets" (2019)
 Dove – "Dove" (2019)
 Dove – "Cleopatra" (2019)
 Delta Airlines – "Get Back to the World Safely" (2021)
 Toyota – "Upstream" (2021)
 Microsoft – "All Starts Now" (2021)
 Microsoft – "Windows 11 - Journey" (2021)
 Mountain View Egypt – "Bubble Buster" (2022)
 CrowdStrike – "Who Invited Gary?" (2023)
 CrowdStrike – "Troy" (2023)

References

External links 
 
 
 Tarsem Singh  at the Music Video DataBase

Living people
1961 births
21st-century Indian film directors
American film directors of Indian descent
Film directors from Punjab, India
Film producers from Punjab, India
Grammy Award winners
Indian advertising directors
Indian male screenwriters
Indian music video directors
Indian expatriates in the United States
People from Jalandhar
Punjabi people
Delhi University alumni
Art Center College of Design alumni
Bishop Cotton School Shimla alumni